Hanwell Park was a farming estate in west London. The estate was finally broken up by 1886 after Sir Montagu Sharpe had sold the holding he had inherited.

Brent Valley golf club was formed from the estate of The Grove - a landed estate of 29 acres formed on the breakup of the much larger Hanwell Park estate in 1837 and enfranchised in 1860.  Nearby is Cuckoo Hill, the site of a battle between Romano-British and Saxons in the sixth century known as Blood(y) Croft and this bloodshed is a suggested origin of the name Hanwell; haenwael being a slaughter on high ground.  The graves of seven Saxon leaders were found on this site in 1886 along with broken spearheads.  The land was then built upon with Edwardian housing in 1905 when the London United Tramways Company was at last allowed to run trams through Ealing borough in 1901, causing a further wave of housing development in the area.

Hanwell Park house
Hanwell Park was a neoclassical house built in the 19th century. John Henry Brady, in his 1838 guide A new pocket guide to London and its environs, described the estate as an "attractive seat" whilst others noted that though not large it was situated in extensive grounds. Sir Archibald Macdonald, once Chief Baron of the Exchequer had owned the house, but it was demolished around 1928 part of a wave of demolition of English country houses.

Maps

References

Middlesex